The 2016 Aspria Tennis Cup was a professional tennis tournament played on clay courts. It was the eleventh edition of the tournament which was part of the 2016 ATP Challenger Tour. It took place in Milan, Italy between 20 and 26 June 2016.

Singles main-draw entrants

Seeds

 1 Rankings are as of June 13, 2016.

Other entrants
The following players received wildcards into the singles main draw:
  Matteo Donati
  Edoardo Eremin
  Gianluca Mager
  Gianluigi Quinzi

The following player received entry into the singles main draw as a special exempt:
  Juan Ignacio Londero

The following players received entry as alternates:
  Emilio Gómez 
  Aslan Karatsev 
  Maximilian Marterer

The following players received entry from the qualifying draw:
  Andrea Basso
  Nicolás Jarry 
  Václav Šafránek
  Lorenzo Sonego

Champions

Singles

  Marco Cecchinato def.  Laslo Đere, 6–2, 6–2

Doubles

  Miguel Ángel Reyes-Varela /  Max Schnur def.  Alessandro Motti /  Peng Hsien-yin, 1–6, 7–6(7–4), [10–5]

References

External links
Official Website

Aspria Tennis Cup
Aspria Tennis Cup